Downward Slope (Spanish:Cuesta abajo) is a 1934 American-Argentine musical film directed by Louis J. Gasnier and starring Carlos Gardel, Mona Maris and Vicente Padula.

Cast
 Carlos Gardel as Carlos Acosta  
 Mona Maris as Raquel  
 Vicente Padula as Jorge Linares  
 Anita Campillo as Rosa  
 Jaime Devesa as Bastida  
 Guillermo Arcos as Don Pedro  
 Suzanne Dulier as Aida  
 Manuel Peluffo as Gutierrez  
 Carlos Spaventa as Corrales 
 José Moriche as Doorman at night club

References

Bibliography 
 Corey Creekmur & Linda Mokdad. The International Film Musical. Edinburgh University Press, 2012.

External links 
 
 

1934 films
Argentine musical films
1934 musical films
1930s Spanish-language films
Films directed by Louis J. Gasnier
American musical films
American black-and-white films
Argentine black-and-white films
1930s American films
1930s Argentine films